Kitturu Chennamma is a 1961 Indian Kannada-language historical drama film directed and produced by B. R. Panthulu. It stars B. Saroja Devi as Kittur Chennamma, an Indian freedom fighter who led an armed rebellion against the British East India Company in 1824, and died in captivity in 1829. Dr. Rajkumar played the role of Raja Mallasarja whereas Raja Shankar played the role of his son.

Panthulu adapted the play Kittooru Chennamma by Anakru for the plotline of the movie based on the recommendation of his assistant Puttanna Kanagal. At the 9th National Film Awards, the film was awarded the Best Feature Film in Kannada. This film screened at IFFI 1992 B R Panthalu Homage section.

Plot

Cast 
 B. Saroja Devi as Kittur Chennamma
 M. V. Rajamma as Rudrambe
 Leelavathi as Veeravva
 Chindodi Leela as Kalavathi
 Ramadevi as Mahantavva
 Rajkumar as Raja Mallasarja
 Dikki Madhava Rao
 Narasimharaju
 Balakrishna as Harana Setty
 B. Hanumanthachar
 Eshwarappa
 K. S. Ashwath
 Rajashankar
 Veerappa Chinchodi

Soundtrack 
The music for the film was composed by T. G. Lingappa and lyrics for the soundtrack penned by G. V. Iyer. The songs "Kolu Thudiya Kodagananthe" and "Thanukaragadavaralli Pushpava" were taken from the poems of Akka Mahadevi, a poet who lived in the 12th century Karnataka.

Track list

References

External links 
 

1961 films
1960s Kannada-language films
Indian biographical films
Films set in the 19th century
History of India on film
Films scored by T. G. Lingappa
Films directed by B. R. Panthulu
1960s biographical films